Pamela Oliver may refer to:

 Pamela E. Oliver, an American sociologist
 Pam Oliver, an American sports journalist
 Pamela Stuart Oliver, a fictional character